A buttercross, also known as butter cross or butter market, is a type of market cross associated with English market towns and dating from medieval times. The name originates from the fact that the crosses were located in market places, where people from neighbouring villages would gather to buy locally produced butter, milk and eggs. The fresh produce was laid out and displayed on the circular stepped bases of the cross.

Their design varies from place to place, but they are often covered by some type of roof to offer shelter. The roofs were generally added at a much later date than the construction of the original cross.

Known buttercrosses
Examples from most parts of England include:

Abbots Bromley, Staffordshire
Alnwick, Northumberland
Alveley, Shropshire
Bainton, Cambridgeshire
Barnard Castle, County Durham (Barnard Castle Market Cross)
Barrow, Rutland
Biddulph, Staffordshire
Bingham, Nottinghamshire
Bingley, West Yorkshire
Brigg, Lincolnshire
Bungay, Suffolk
Burwell, Lincolnshire
Castle Combe, Wiltshire
 Chagford, Devon
Cheddar, Somerset (Market Cross, Cheddar)
Chichester, West Sussex
Chippenham, Wiltshire
Corby Glen,  Lincolnshire
Cranwell, Lincolnshire
Digby, Lincolnshire
Dunster, Somerset (Dunster Butter Cross)
Fishlake, Doncaster, South Yorkshire
Grantham, Lincolnshire
Gringley-on-the-Hill, Nottinghamshire
Hallaton, Leicestershire
Hooton Pagnell, South Yorkshire
Kirkby Moorside, North Yorkshire
Ludlow, Shropshire
Maltby, South Yorkshire
Mansfield, Nottinghamshire
Market Drayton, Shropshire
Marton, Lincolnshire
Monk Bretton, South Yorkshire,
Mountsorrel, Leicestershire
Newport, Shropshire (Puleston Cross)
Oakham Market Cross, Oakham, Rutland
Otley, West Yorkshire
Peterborough, Cambridgeshire
Pontefract, West Yorkshire
Preston, Lancashire
Sarsden, Oxfordshire
 Salisbury, Wiltshire
Scarborough, North Yorkshire
Shepton Mallet, Somerset
 Somerton, Somerset
Spilsby, Lincolnshire
Stamfordham, Northumberland
Swaffham, Norfolk
Swinstead, Lincolnshire
Tattershall, Lincolnshire
Thatcham, Berkshire
Tickhill, South Yorkshire
Wainfleet All Saints, Lincolnshire
Whittlesey, Cambridgeshire
Winchester, Hampshire
Witney, Oxfordshire
Wymondham, Norfolk

External links

Cross symbols
Monuments and memorials in England